Mohammed Muntari Tagoe (born 8 January 1992), is a Ghanaian footballer who plays for Jimma Aba Jifar in Ethiopia as a goalkeeper. Tagoe comes from Accra in the Greater Accra Region of Ghana.

Club career

Madina Youth FC
Muntari spent a number of seasons with Madina Youth FC (third-tier side in Accra) before he joined Medeama S.C. of Tarkwa. He played there from 2008 to 2010.

Medeama SC (2010-2017)
Tagoe joined Medeama S.C. in the 2010–2011 Ghana Premier League season where he signed a long-term contract. He spent a total of six seasons at the Tarkwa and Aboaso Park. He won three trophies at the club including two FA Cup titles. He was the captain of the team as of 2014–2016.

Tagoe featured in Medeama 3–1 defeat to TP Mazembe in the CAF Confederation Cup in 2016, he made lots of saves which prevented TP Mazembe from getting more in before half time.  Medeama SC knocked out Al Ittihad and Al Shendy of Libya and Sudan respectively in the previous rounds to book a ticket with Mamelodi Sundowns.

Lusaka Dynamos F.C.(2017)
Muntari signed a two-year deal with Lusaka Dynamos F.C. In February 2017.

Jimma Aba Jifar 
In October 2019, he joined Ethiopian side Jimma Aba Jifar, after terminating his contract with Kumasi Asante Kotoko. He returned to Ghana in July 2020, amidst the COVID-19 pandemic.

International career 
In 2012, Ghana U20 coach Maxwell Konadu invited 27 players to start preparing for the 2013 African Youth Championship final qualifier against Morocco. Muntari was included in the squad. He was also enlisted in the 18-man squad to face Uganda in July 2012 in a penultimate 2013 African Youth Championship qualifier. Muntari was also featured in the local Black Stars team that was invited by coach Maxwell Konadu to start preparations ahead of their international friendly match against Japan U23 national team on May 11, 2016.

Honours

Club 
Medeama
Ghanaian FA Cup: 2013, 2015
Ghana Super Cup: 2016

Individual
Ghanaian Premier League Best Goalkeeper nominee: 2012, 2014
Ghanaian FA Cup Best Goalkeeper Award: 2013, 2015

References

External links

 CAF CC: Medeama thumped 3-1 by Mazembe

1992 births
Living people
Footballers from Accra
Ghanaian footballers
Ghanaian expatriate footballers
Ghana international footballers
Medeama SC players
Lusaka Dynamos F.C. players
Asante Kotoko S.C. players
Jimma Aba Jifar F.C. players
Association football goalkeepers
Ghanaian expatriate sportspeople in Zambia
Ghanaian expatriate sportspeople in Ethiopia
Expatriate footballers in Zambia
Expatriate footballers in Ethiopia